Fame for 15 is an American television series that aired on The Nashville Network from October 22, 2001 to November 10, 2001.

Overview
The series profiled regular individuals who made headlines or were newsmakers for a brief time. People covered include Donato Dalyrmple, the fisherman who rescued Elián González, Scott O'Grady, Jim Morris, Darva Conger, John Wayne Bobbitt, Ellie Nesler, Divine Brown, Tommie Smith, George Holliday, the man who filmed the Rodney King video, and Who Wants to be a Millionaire winner John Carpenter.

References

External links
Fame for 15 on IMDb

2001 American television series debuts
2001 American television series endings
The Nashville Network original programming